Estado de México–Faren Kuota was a professional women's cycling team based in the Mexico, which competed in elite road bicycle racing events such as the UCI Women's Road World Cup.

Team history

2014

Riders out
On September 18 Lucy Martin left the team, joining Matrix Fitness-Vulpine for the 2015 season.  On October 11, Fabiana Luperini announced her retirement from the sport. On October 17 Rossella Ratto and Anna Trevisi left the team to join ASD Giusfredi Ciclismo for the 2015 season. On October 30, Maria Giuli Confalonieri and Arianna Fidanza left the team, joining Alé–Cipollini, along with Uenia Fernandes on November 5, for the 2015 season. On 12 November Borgato Giada retired from professional cycling.

Major wins

2012
Oceania Cycling Championships — Road Race, Gracie Elvin
Stage 5  Energiewacht Tour, Nicole Cooke
Stage 2a Giro del Trentino Alto Adige, Fabiana Luperini
2013
Teams Classification Tour of Chongming Island
Points classification Tour Languedoc Roussillon, Marta Bastienelli
 Stage 2, Marta Bastienelli
2014
 Young rider classification The Women's Tour, Rossella Ratto
Stage 2, Rossella Ratto
 Mountains classification Auensteiner-Radsporttage, Rossella Ratto
 Young rider classification, Rossella Ratto
 Young rider classification Tour Cycliste Féminin International de l'Ardèche, Rossella Ratto
 Mountains classification, Rossella Ratto
 Sprints classification, Elena Cecchini
 Combination classification, Rossella Ratto
Youth classification UCI Women's Road World Cup, Elena Cecchini
Giro dell'Emilia Internazionale Donne Elite, Rossella Ratto

National & European Champions
2012
 Switzerland Road Race, Jennifer Hohl
 Russia Road Race, Yulia Blindyuk
2013
 Switzerland  Time Trial, Patricia Schwager
 Finland Time Trial, Sari Saarelainen
 U23 European Road Race, Susanna Zorzi
 U23 European Track, Maria Giulia Confalonieri
 Italian Track (Points race), Elena Cecchini
 Italian Track (Team Pursuit), Elena Cecchini
2014
 Italian Road Race, Elena Cecchini
 Italian Track (Team Pursuit), Elena Cecchini

References

Cycling teams based in Italy
UCI Women's Teams
Cycling teams established in 2012
Defunct cycling teams
Cycling teams disestablished in 2014
Defunct cycling teams based in Italy